Joanne Ernst is an American former triathlete who won the 1985 Hawaii Ironman Triathlon.

Results

Family
Joanne Ernst is married to management consultant and writer Jim Collins. They have no children.

Notes 

American female triathletes
Ironman world champions
Living people

Year of birth missing (living people)
21st-century American women